Albert R. Pechan (May 13, 1902 – September 11, 1969) is a former member of the Pennsylvania State Senate who served from 1949 to 1969.

He graduated from the University of Pittsburgh School of Dental Medicine in 1928.

References

Republican Party Pennsylvania state senators
1969 deaths
University of Pittsburgh alumni
1902 births
People from Ford City, Pennsylvania
20th-century American politicians